Kristīne Gaile (born 26 January 1997) with her twin sister Ieva Gaile are Latvian figure skaters. She was born in Jelgava, Latvia, where she started her skating career at the age of four. After two years she switched her coaches and started training in Ventspils, Latvia. She mainly skated in the ladies singles category, but in 2012 she and her twin sister were part of Latvian Synchronized skating team "Amber" and they participated in the World Synchronized Skating Championship 2012 (WSSC). In 2015, she switched coaches and started training in Jelgava, Latvia. She rejoined Synchronized skating team "Amber" in 2015. "Amber" is the only Synchronized Skating team in Latvia and since 2012 has competed in ISU competitions and World Championships.

Program

Competitive highlights

References

Latvian female single skaters
Sportspeople from Jelgava
1997 births
Living people
Twin sportspeople
Latvian twins